The ornate cuscus or Molluccan cuscus (Phalanger ornatus) is a species of marsupial in the family Phalangeridae. It is endemic to Indonesia, where it is found on the North Maluku islands of Halmahera, Bacan and Morotai, at elevations from sea level to 1000 m.

References

Possums
Mammals of Indonesia
Mammals described in 1860
Taxonomy articles created by Polbot